Neotiara is a genus of sea snails, marine gastropod mollusks in the subfamily Mitrinae of the  family Mitridae.

Species
Species within the genus Neotiara include:
 Neotiara crenata (Broderip, 1836)
 Neotiara fultoni  (E. A. Smith, 1892)
 Neotiara gausapata (Reeve, 1845)
 Neotiara lens (W. Wood, 1828)
 Neotiara muricata (Broderip, 1836)
 Neotiara nodulosa  (Gmelin, 1791)
 Neotiara pallida (Nowell-Usticke, 1959)
 Neotiara rupicola (Reeve, 1844)
 Neotiara sphoni  (Shasky & G. B. Campbell, 1964)

References

External links
 Fedosov A., Puillandre N., Herrmann M., Kantor Yu., Oliverio M., Dgebuadze P., Modica M.V. & Bouchet P. (2018). The collapse of Mitra: molecular systematics and morphology of the Mitridae (Gastropoda: Neogastropoda). Zoological Journal of the Linnean Society. 183(2): 253-337

 
Mitridae
Gastropod genera